White Waltham Airfield  is an operational general aviation aerodrome located at White Waltham,  southwest of Maidenhead, in the Royal Borough of Windsor and Maidenhead in Berkshire, England.

This large grass airfield is best known for its association with the Air Transport Auxiliary from 1940 to 1945 and also has a significant history of prewar flying training, wartime and postwar RAF use and postwar use as a flight test centre by the Fairey and Westland aircraft companies. In the mid-1950s it was HQ of RAF Home Command. It is now privately owned and is the home of the West London Aero Club.

Operational history
The airfield was set up in 1928 when the de Havilland family bought  of grassland to house the de Havilland Flying School. In 1938 the airfield was taken over by the government, and during the Second World War was the home of the Air Transport Auxiliary between its formation in early 1940 and disbandment on 30 November 1945. The ATA staged a unique Air Display and Air Pageant at White Waltham on 29 September 1945 which was opened by Lord Beaverbrook and featured a memorable static park of Allied and German aircraft and the flying included Alex Henshaw displaying a Seafire Mk45.

After the war, the airfield was also used by Fairey Aviation and later Westland Helicopters, which assembled and tested aircraft built at their Hayes factory. These included the Fairey FB-1 Gyrodyne (1947), Fairey Jet Gyrodyne (1954), Fairey Ultralight (1955), Fairey Rotodyne (1957) & Westland Scout (1960) & Westland Wasp (1962). The prototype Fairey Gannet was first flown from Aldermaston but production aircraft were completed and first flown at White Waltham too and an example is currently stored at the airfield.

Prince Philip, Duke of Edinburgh, was taught to fly at White Waltham in 1952, flying a de Havilland Chipmunk belonging to HQ RAF Home Command Communications Squadron (HCCS) of the Royal Air Force (RAF). This squadron was based at the airfield from 1950 until 1959.

The airfield stayed under RAF control until 1982, when it was purchased by the current owners. Until 2007 it was the base of Thames Valley & Chiltern Air Ambulance helicopter.

Approximately 150 light aircraft are based at the airfield which, with three runways, is reportedly the largest grass airfield in civilian use in Europe. The airfield holds Civil Aviation Authority Public Use Aerodrome Licence Number P773, that allows flights for the public transport of passengers or for flight training.

Non-aviation events
On 24 June 1989, the Fairey Hangar, on the north side of the airfield, was the venue for one of the largest acid house raves to be held at that time. The Sunrise Midsummer Party was attended by over 11,000 ravers, and attracted about 1,000 vehicles. This caused  tailbacks on the approach to the airfield. The Sun newspaper ran a headline "Ecstasy Airport" the next day.

The home quarters of Carter's Steam Fair are adjacent to the airfield.

In October 2010, the airfield was turned into a 1950s London Heathrow Airport for the filming of the 2011 film My Week with Marilyn.

White Waltham Airfield also featured as the fictional Finchmere Airfield in the Midsomer Murders episode "The Flying Club", also using footage from the annual Retrofestival held at White Waltham.

In July 2017 White Waltham Airfield became the location in the Flight Simulator Flight Sim World for the Light Aircraft Pilots License given by the fictional Waltham Flying Club

References

Citations

Bibliography
 
 Waltham - A Village at War 1939-45 by Dennis Tomlinson, 
 'White Waltham Impressions - Photographs Taken at the ATA Pageant on Saturday 29 September' in 'The Aeroplane Spotter', 18 October 1945

External links

 West London Aero Club official site
 Multimap aerial photo

Airports in South East England
Transport in Berkshire
White Waltham